The 1963 Society of Film and Television Arts Television Awards, the United Kingdom's premier television awards ceremony. The awards later became known as the British Academy Television Awards, under which name they are still given.

Winners
Actor
Harry H. Corbett
Actress
Brenda Bruce
Drama
David Rose, Charles Jarrott
Factual
Richard Cawston
Additional
Geoffrey Cox
Light Entertainment (Production)
Duncan Wood
Light Entertainment (Performance)
Michael Bentine
Desmond Davis Award for Services to Television
Cecil McGivern

External links
Archive of winners on official BAFTA website (retrieved 19 February 2006).

1963
1963 in the United Kingdom
1963 television awards
1963 in British television